The following outline traces the territorial evolution of the U.S. State of Nevada.

Outline
Historical territorial claims of Spain in the present State of Nevada:
Nueva California, 1768–1804
Gran Cuenca, 1776–1821
Alta California, 1804–1821
Adams–Onis Treaty of 1819
Historical international territory in the present State of Nevada:
Oregon Country, 1818–1846
Anglo-American Convention of 1818
Historical territorial claims of Mexico in the present State of Nevada:
Gran Cuenca, 1821–1848
Alta California, 1821–1848
Treaty of Guadalupe Hidalgo of 1848
Historical political divisions of the United States in the present State of Nevada:
Unorganized territory created by the Treaty of Guadalupe Hidalgo, 1848–1850
Compromise of 1850
State of Deseret (extralegal), 1849–1850
Territory of Utah, 1850–1896
Nataqua Territory (extralegal), 1856-1861
Territory of Nevada, 1861–1864
Nevada Organic Act, 	March 2, 1861
Western 53 miles of the Utah Territory is transferred to the Territory of Nevada, July 14, 1862
Nevada Enabling Act, March 21, 1864
State of Nevada since 1864
Nevada Statehood, October 31, 1864
Another 53 miles of western Utah Territory is transferred to the State of Nevada, May 5, 1866
Northwestern corner of the Arizona Territory is transferred to the State of Nevada, January 18, 1867

See also

Historical outline of Nevada
History of Nevada
Territorial evolution of the United States
 Territorial evolution of Arizona
 Territorial evolution of California
 Territorial evolution of Idaho
 Territorial evolution of Oregon
 Territorial evolution of Utah

References

External links
State of Nevada website
Nevada History

Nevada
Nevada
Nevada
Nevada
History of Nevada
Geography of Nevada